Douglas Burrage Snelling (1916–1985) was an Australian architect and furniture designer.

He was born in 1916 in Gravesend, Kent, England Douglas Snelling arrived in Wellington, New Zealand, with his parents in 1926. As a teenager, began his own graphic arts and shop window design business in Wanganui. In 1937 he travelled to Hollywood, where he freelanced making sketches, and began to emulate Errol Flynn's style.  He returned to New Zealand in 1938 and became a writer, broadcaster and publicist of new movies and stars from 1938 to 1940.

He moved to Sydney in 1940 and worked as a publicist and in a munitions factory during the beginning of World War II. In 1945 he married NZ heiress Nancy Springhall.  With her money he opened a business designing shop windows and furniture.  His chairs featured parachute webbing and modernist design and according to the Powerhouse Museum, were "Australia's first popular, mass produced range of furniture sold widely through the major department stores from the late 1940s to the mid 1950s." He also did work for an electronics manufacturer, Kriesler, including the design of the case of their iconic 'Beehive' radio.

He and his wife travelled to America where Snelling was inspired by Frank Lloyd Wright's work.  When they returned to Australia in 1948, Snelling met architect, Harry Seidler, and began designing houses. He became a registered architect in 1952.  He built modernist houses, apartment buildings, and office buildings. One of his designs won the 1955 House of the Year Award from Architecture and Arts magazine.

He and his wife divorced in 1959 and the next year he married Patricia Gale (daughter of a wealthy Sydney property developer and grazier), with whom he raised three sons and her daughter by a previous marriage.  In the mid-1960s they travelled to Cambodia, which started a long interest in that country that led him to a friendship with Prince Sihanouk, an appointment as an honorary consul (1970–75), and a hobby of collecting and trading Khmer antiquities.

After Patricia's death in 1976, he moved with his teenage sons to Honolulu, where he married Swedish artist Marianne Sparre in the early 1980s. In 1985, he was concerned enough about his failing health to suddenly book a flight back to Sydney, where he died several days later of a brain aneurism.

Snelling and looted antiquities
In a June 2022 episode of the ABC Radio National current affairs series Background Briefing, it was reported that, during his time in Asia, Snelling had acquired many pieces of rare Khmer art for his private collection via the black market, knowing them to have been looted. 

Snelling exhibited his collection of Kymer artifacts at the Australia Museum, in 1974. At the time, the collection was said to be worth $A280,000. The exhibition was opened by the Chhut Chhour, the Ambassador of the Khmer Republic, which fell to the Kymer Rouge in 1975. He had obtained about twenty artefacts in 1965. Apart from a few small pieces he said were given to him by members of the Cambodian Royal Family, he stated, in an excerpt from a personal letter he wrote during this time, that the rest were purchased "outside the borders of Cambodia", presumably in Thailand. 

In the same personal letter, Snelling bragged about how cheaply he had acquired the Khmer antiquities (many of which are believed to have been looted from Angkor Wat), he derided the people he purchased the items from as "ignorant peasants", and he described in detail how he had shipped various items home to Sydney but had kept others with him so that he could successfully smuggle them out of Thailand. The ABC report also cited evidence, discovered in a 1970s episode of the ABC-TV current affairs series Four Corners, when Snelling was interviewed about design at his Sydney home, in which many key Khmer items in his collection are clearly visible. Most or all of the collection was reportedly sold off some time before Snelling's death, and Background Briefing was able to trace several of these looted pieces, which are now held by major US institutions, including the Norton Simon Museum and the Los Angeles County Museum of Art.

References

Further reading
 Bogle, Michael. Design in Australia 1880-1970. Craftsman House, 1998. 
 Bogle, Michael. Designing Australia: readings in the history of design. Pluto Press, 2002 
 Grant, Kirsty, et al. Mid-century Modern: Australian Furniture Design. Melbourne: National Gallery of Victoria, 2014. 
 Jackson, Davina. 'Douglas Snelling: Pan-Pacific Adventures in Modern Design and Architecture'. PhD thesis for RMIT University, 2007.
 Jackson, Davina. Douglas Snelling: Pan-Pacific Modern Design and Architecture. London: Routledge, 2016.
 Jahn, Graham. A Guide to Sydney Architecture. Watermark Press, 1997 
 Snelling, Douglas. Circa 1966. 'Letter to the Editor: Sydney Opera House' in Stephen, Ann, McNamara, Andrew E., & Goad, Philip. Modernism & Australia: Documents on art, design and architecture 1817-1967. Melbourne: The Miegunyah Press, 2006. 

1916 births
1985 deaths
People from Gravesend, Kent
20th-century Australian architects
British emigrants to New Zealand
New Zealand emigrants to Australia